So Let's Go is the second solo album by Alan Doyle, released on January 20, 2015.

Track listing

Chart performance

Singles
The lead single off the album, "So Let's Go", was released November 6, 2014, by Universal Music Canada in Canada and Skinner's Hill Music Ltd. in the United States.

References

http://www.billboard.com/artist/1482044/alan-doyle/chart?f=309

2015 albums
Alan Doyle albums